Polyvinyl acetate phthalate (PVAP) is a commonly used polymer phthalate in the formulation of pharmaceuticals, such as the enteric coating of tablets or capsules.  It is a vinyl acetate polymer that is partially hydrolyzed and then esterified with phthalic acid. Its main use in pharmaceutics is with enteric formulations and controlled release formulations.

See also
 Cellulose acetate phthalate

References

Vinyl polymers
Acetate esters